Dobro Polje can also refer to:

 Dobro Polje, a village in the municipality of Kalinovik, Republika Srpska, Bosnia and Herzegovina
 Dobro Polje, Radovljica, a settlement on the left bank of the Sava River in the Municipality of Radovljica, Slovenia
 Dobro Polje, Ilirska Bistrica, a small settlement west of Ilirska Bistrica in the Inner Carniola region of Slovenia
 Dobro Polje (Crna Trava), a village in the municipality of Crna Trava, Serbia
 Dobro Polje (Boljevac), a village in the municipality of Boljevac, Serbia
 Dobro Pole or Dóbro Pólie, a peak on border between Macedonia and Greece
 Battle of Dobro Pole, a World War I battle, fought on 15 September 1918

See also
 Dobro (disambiguation)